Route 123 is a highway in southwest Missouri.  Its northern terminus is at U.S. Route 54 in Weaubleau; its southern terminus is at U.S. Route 160 in Willard.

Route description
The current highway begins in Weableau.  South of Humansville, it crosses Route 13 and at Fair Play it intersects Route 32.  At Aldrich, the road crosses Stockton Lake, then forms a concurrency with Route 215 to Eudora.  At the north edge of Willard, the road ends at US 160.  

Originally, the highway continued all the way to Springfield, passing through town on various streets (one of which was West Bypass) and leaving town on Campbell Avenue.  The path south of Springfield is modern US 160 and headed through Nixa, Highlandville, and Spokane.  At Spokane, old Route 123 followed modern Route 176 (US 160 also followed this route until the newer highway was built) to Walnut Shade where the highway ended.

History
The original termini of the highway were at Route 64 in Fair Play and Route 76 in Walnut Shade, Missouri.  The road, however, would be extended further north and shortened to the south.  From Willard, the highway continued on through Springfield, Nixa, Highlandville, and to Walnut Shade.

Route 13 would be moved to a new road further east (providing a shorter route between Bolivar and Springfield, and Route 123 would take over the old Route 13 path.  

The southern end of the highway was truncated when U.S. Route 160 was extended from its former terminus in Springfield, and the road's terminus was moved back to Springfield (at US 160), and later still (in the 1980s) back to Willard when US 160 was rerouted.

Major intersections

References 

123
Transportation in Greene County, Missouri
Transportation in Polk County, Missouri
Transportation in Hickory County, Missouri